Puya ultima is a species in the genus Puya. This species is endemic to Bolivia.

References

ultima
Flora of Bolivia